Bahía Honda Municipal Museum is a museum located in the 23rd avenue in Bahía Honda, Cuba. It was established as a museum on 23 June 1983.

The museum holds collections on history, weaponry, ethnology, numismatics and archeology.

See also 
 List of museums in Cuba

References 

Museums in Cuba
Buildings and structures in Artemisa Province
Museums established in 1983
1983 establishments in Cuba
20th-century architecture in Cuba